Mummy Punjabiis the 2011 film written and directed by Pammi Somal starring Kiron Kher, Kanwaljit Singh and Jackie Shroff in lead roles.

Synopsis
Mummy Punjabi is a New Age Mother India, with today's grandeur, intensity, humour & emotions. A complete family entertainer, wherein a Punjabi urban mother balances tradition with her own value system.

Cast
 Kirron Kher as Baby Kaur 
 Kanwaljit Singh as Rajinder Singh 
 Jackie Shroff as Kanwal Sandhu 
 Anju Mahendru as Kanwal's Sister 
 Divya Dutta  as Muniya - Maidservant 
 Sachin Sharma as Karan R. Arora 
 Viraf Patel as Dr. Arjun R. Arora
 Simran Vaid as Simran R. Arora 
 Supriya Shukla as Bittu 
 Urwashi Gandhi as Jeena W. Puri 
 Michael Joseph as Sid 
 Freddy Daruwala as Sexy Sam 
 Manav Vij as Vikramjit Singh
 Kashif Khan as DJ Abraham
 Gurdas Maan as Dancer / Singer (as Gurdas Maan) 
 Satish Kaushik as Rajeev Bhalla 
 Rohit Roy as Salman Khan / Rahul Sharma

Soundtrack

Reception
Mummy Punjabi received generally negative reviews from critics. Nikhat Kazmi of The Times of India gave the film a 2 star rating out of 5 saying, "The problem with Mummy Punjabi lies in the fact that it is neither a comedy nor a serious film, just something in-between. Wonder who is the target audience!".

Daily Bhaskar gave the film a single star out of five and said, "Nothing sums up ‘Mummy Punjabi,’ better than a brain-numbing movie with a mayhem stirring family drama. Add to this, outrageously bad acting by the supporting cast. This one's not recommended at all."

References

External links
 
 Official website

2011 films
2010s Hindi-language films
Punjabi-language Indian films
2010s Punjabi-language films